Staro-Almyasovo (İśke Älmäs) is a rural locality (a village) in Ibrayevsky Selsoviet, Kugarchinsky District, Bashkortostan, Russia. The population was 5 as of 2010. There are 2 streets.

Geography 
Staro-Almyasovo is located 17 km northwest of Mrakovo (the district's administrative centre) by road. Siksanbayevo is the nearest rural locality.

References 

Rural localities in Kugarchinsky District